Sheepridge is a hamlet in the parish of Little Marlow, in Buckinghamshire, England.

The hamlet is located in a small indentation of an outlying part of the Chiltern Hills. It can be found on Sheepridge Lane, which connects Flackwell Heath to Well End and Bourne End.

There are a few houses and one public house, The Crooked Billet.

Hamlets in Buckinghamshire